"My Reason" is a song by Greek singer Demis Roussos. It was released as a single in 1972.

The song was included on Roussos' 1973 album Forever and Ever.

Background and writing 
The song was written by Stélios Vlavianós, Harry Chalkitis, and Charalampe Chalkitis. The recording was produced by Demis Roussos.

There is also a Spanish-language version, titled "Mi razon".

Commercial performance 
The song reached no. 1 in Netherlands and no. 2 in Belgium (Flanders).

The single also was a hit in Greece. As U.S. Billboard reported in its January 23, 1973 issue, 
"during the first two weeks of December" the single "My Reason" (Philips) was among "the top disks in northern Greece" "according to weekly best seller chart published by the daily newspaper Hellinikos Vorras.

Track listing

"My Reason" 
7" single Philips 6009 249 (1972)
7" single Philips S 53673 (1972)
7" single RTB / Philips S 53673 (1973, Yugoslavia)
 A. "My Reason" (4:03)
 B. "When I am a Kid" (3:17)

"When I Am a Kid / My Reason" 
7" single Philips 6009 249 (1972)
 A. "When I am a Kid" (3:17)
 B. "My Reason" (4:03)

Charts

Weekly charts

Year-end charts

Cover versions 
The song was covered in Turkish (under the title "Sevince") by Tanju Okan.

Also covered by Marinella as "Pou Pane ekina ta paidia"

References 

1972 songs
1972 singles
Demis Roussos songs
Philips Records singles
Song recordings produced by Demis Roussos
Songs written by Stélios Vlavianós